Coleman Hawkins (born December 10, 2001) is an American college basketball player for Illinois Fighting Illini of the Big Ten Conference.

Early life and high school career
Hawkins grew up in Antelope, California and initially attended Antelope High School. He transferred to Prolific Prep in Napa, California after his sophomore year. As a senior, he averaged 12.5 points, 4.5 rebounds, and 6.5 assists per game, leading his team to a 31–3 record. Hawkins was rated a three-star recruit and committed to playing college basketball for Illinois over offers from Rutgers, San Diego State, Marquette, and USC.

College career
Hawkins played in 25 games, all coming off the bench, during his freshman season at Illinois and averaged 1.4 points per game. He played in all 33 of the Fighting Illini's games with 14 starts during his sophomore season, averaging 5.9 points and 4.3 rebounds per game. Hawkins entered his junior season as Illinois's starting power forward. On November 29, 2022, Hawkins recorded a 15-point, 10-assist, 10-rebound triple-double in a 73–44 win against Syracuse. This was the fifth triple-double by any player in Illinois history.

Career statistics

College

|-
| style="text-align:left;"| 2020–21
| style="text-align:left;"| Illinois
| 25 || 0 || 6.3 || .345 || .231 || .684 || .8 || .4 || .1 || .4 || 1.4
|-
| style="text-align:left;"| 2021–22
| style="text-align:left;"| Illinois
| 33 || 14 || 19.0 || .442 || .292 || .650 || 4.3 || 1.5 || .8 || .5 || 5.9
|- class="sortbottom"
| style="text-align:center;" colspan="2"| Career
| 58 || 14 || 13.5 || .426 || .282 || .658 || 2.8 || 1.1 || .5 || .4 || 4.0

Personal life
Hawkins' father, Rodney Hawkins, played college basketball at San Diego State. His great uncle, Tom Hawkins, was an All-American basketball player at Notre Dame and played in the National Basketball Association (NBA) for ten seasons. Hawkins is the youngest of nine children and three of his older sisters played basketball in college.

References

External links
Illinois Fighting Illini bio

2001 births
Living people
American men's basketball players
Basketball players from California
Illinois Fighting Illini men's basketball players
Power forwards (basketball)